JAT Holdings PLC is a Sri Lanka based multinational paint company headquartered in Thalawathugoda, Sri Lanka. The company is engaged in the business of manufacturing, selling and distribution of paints, wood coatings and products related to the retail and industrial sectors. As of 2016, it has the largest market share with 75% in the Sri Lankan paint industry.

History
The company was started in 1993 by Aelian Gunawardene and named the company from the initials of the three founding brothers. The company first became the principal agent of the Italian multinational company Sayerlack and introduced polyurethane coatings in Sri Lanka. In 2002, the company set up a large scale manufacturing plant in Kahathuduwa.

In 2015, the company acquired Ceynox Networks, an information technology company and created the JAT Technologies. In 2017, the company signed cricketer Rangana Herath as their brand ambassador.

In 2020, JAT Holdings was ranked amongst the LMD's Top 20 Conglomerate Brands in Sri Lanka.

In 2021 JAT Holdings was listed in the Colombo Stock Exchange (CSE), .

Business
The company is a manufacturer of paints and coatings; and also a distributor of brands including Sayerlack, Harris, BormaWachs, Norton, Brush Master, Masters, J CHEM. JAT holdings also offer a furnishing range of brands such as Herman Miller, SEA and Houros. The company entered the real estate development in 1995 and developed residential colonies in the country.

Sponsorships 
The company is one of the major sponsor of sports in the country and has sponsored several events for cricket, tennis, golf and other major sports.

References 

Companies listed on the Colombo Stock Exchange
Manufacturing companies established in 1993
Manufacturing companies of Sri Lanka
Sri Lankan companies established in 1993